is a passenger railway station located in the town of Kumenan, Kume District, Okayama Prefecture, Japan, operated by West Japan Railway Company (JR West).

Lines

Station layout
The station consists of one ground-level side platform serving a singe bi-directional track. It formerly had a second side platform, and the unused platform is left in situ. The station building is a gable-style wooden building that was rebuilt in 1998. The station is unattended.

Adjacent stations

History
Kōme Station opened on December 21, 1898 with the opening of the Tsuyama Line.  With the privatization of the Japan National Railways (JNR) on April 1, 1987, the station came under the aegis of the West Japan Railway Company.

Passenger statistics
In fiscal 2019, the station was used by an average of 65 passengers daily..

Surrounding area
 Japan National Route 53.

See also
List of railway stations in Japan

References

External links

 Kōme Station Official Site

Railway stations in Okayama Prefecture
Tsuyama Line
Railway stations in Japan opened in 1898
Kumenan, Okayama